Turbo radiatus is a species of sea snail, a marine gastropod mollusk in the family Turbinidae, the turban snails.

Some authors place the name in the subgenus Turbo (Marmarostoma).

Description
The size of the shell varies between 35 mm and 50 mm.
The imperforate, solid shell has an ovate-conic shape. Its color pattern is whitish, streaked and maculated with brown or green, the darker color often predominating. The conic spire is acute. The 5-6 whorls are convex, irregularly spirally lirate and finely regularly lamellosely longitudinally striate;. They are subcarinate above. The sutures are subcanaliculate. The body whorl is usually biangulate, with a coronal and one or two submedian lirae prominent and armed with more or less numerous vaulted scales or spines. The aperture measures about half the length of the shell. It is pearly white within. The crenate lip is slightly produced at its base. The umbilical region is sometimes slightly indented.

The operculum is flat inside, with five whorls and a subcentral nucleus. Its outer surface is finely tuberculate, cinereous or pale olive.

Distribution
This species occurs in the Red Sea and in the Indian Ocean off Aldabra, Madagascar and the Mascarene Basin; in the Pacific Ocean off the Philippines; off Australia (Northern Territory, Queensland); in the Eastern Mediterranean Sea.

References

 Gmelin J.F. 1791. Caroli a Linné. Systema Naturae per regna tria naturae, secundum classes, ordines, genera, species, cum characteribus, differentiis, synonymis, locis. Lipsiae : Georg. Emanuel. Beer Vermes. Vol. 1(Part 6) pp. 3021-3910.
 Taylor, J.D. (1973). Provisional list of the mollusca of Aldabra Atoll.
 Wilson, B. 1993. Australian Marine Shells. Prosobranch Gastropods. Kallaroo, Western Australia : Odyssey Publishing Vol. 1 408 pp.
 Alf A. & Kreipl K. (2003). A Conchological Iconography: The Family Turbinidae, Subfamily Turbininae, Genus Turbo. Conchbooks, Hackenheim Germany.

External links
  Herbert D.G. (2015). An annotated catalogue and bibliography of the taxonomy, synonymy and distribution of the Recent Vetigastropoda of South Africa (Mollusca). Zootaxa. 4049(1): 1-98

radiatus
Gastropods described in 1791
Taxa named by Johann Friedrich Gmelin